In Greek mythology, Troezen (homophone of treason; ancient Greek: Τροιζήν, modern Greek: Τροιζήνα ) was the eponymous king of the city Troezen.

Family 
Troezen was one of the children of Pelops and Hippodamia, and thus brother to Pittheus, Alcathous, Dimoetes, Pleisthenes, Atreus, Thyestes, Copreus, Hippalcimus, Sciron, Cleones, Letreus, Astydameia, Nicippe, Lysidice and Eurydice.

Troezen was the father of Anaphlystus and Sphettus, who migrated to Attica and gave their names to two demes. Evopis was also credited to be the daughter of Troezen.

Mythology 
Troezen and Pittheus were said to have come from Pisatis to King Aetius, son of Anthas and grandson of Poseidon and Alcyone, who reigned over the cities of Hyperea and Anthea, and to have become his co-rulers and then successors. When Troezen died, Pittheus incorporated the two cities into one and named it Troezen after his brother.

His daughter Evopis married Dimoetes but had an affair with her own brother (not evident whether this was one of the aforementioned Troezen's sons, or another one).

Notes

References 

 Parthenius, Love Romances translated by Sir Stephen Gaselee (1882-1943), S. Loeb Classical Library Volume 69. Cambridge, MA. Harvard University Press. 1916.  Online version at the Topos Text Project.
 Parthenius, Erotici Scriptores Graeci, Vol. 1. Rudolf Hercher. in aedibus B. G. Teubneri. Leipzig. 1858. Greek text available at the Perseus Digital Library.
 Pausanias, Description of Greece with an English Translation by W.H.S. Jones, Litt.D., and H.A. Ormerod, M.A., in 4 Volumes. Cambridge, MA, Harvard University Press; London, William Heinemann Ltd. 1918. . Online version at the Perseus Digital Library
Pausanias, Graeciae Descriptio. 3 vols. Leipzig, Teubner. 1903.  Greek text available at the Perseus Digital Library.
 Strabo, The Geography of Strabo. Edition by H.L. Jones. Cambridge, Mass.: Harvard University Press; London: William Heinemann, Ltd. 1924. Online version at the Perseus Digital Library.
 Strabo, Geographica edited by A. Meineke. Leipzig: Teubner. 1877. Greek text available at the Perseus Digital Library.

Princes in Greek mythology
Kings in Greek mythology
Troezenian mythology